Maidencreek Township is a township in Berks County, Pennsylvania. The population was 9,126 at the 2010 census.

History
Maidencreek Township, established in December 1746, was named after a creek that runs diagonally through the township.  Quakers who settled the area in 1732 lived peacefully among the Lenni Lenape Indians until circa 1800, when the Quakers began to move west.

Over the next 100 years, German and, later, Scots Welsh and Irish settlers purchased and moved into the areas that the Quakers left behind.  First on the scene, the Germans established their language as the dominant language.  Deutsch or “Dutch” became the primary language in the area well into the mid 1900s, when one-room schools still gave instruction in German, and English as a second language was part of the curriculum.

Farming was the primary means of living well into the 1900s until roadways, housing developments and commercial and industrial development began to predominate in the 1980s.

The Guldin Mill was listed on the National Register of Historic Places in 1990.

Geography
According to the U.S. Census Bureau, the township has a total area of 14.4 square miles (37.2 km), of which 13.2 square miles (34.3 km) is land and 1.1 square miles (2.8 km) (7.67%) is water.

Adjacent townships
Perry Township (north)
Richmond Township (east)
Ruscombmanor Township (southeast)
Muhlenberg Township (southwest)
Ontelaunee Township (west)

Neighborhoods
Blandon Meadows
Creekside Manor
Georgetown Village
Golden Manor
Limestone Village
Maidencreek Estates
Maidencreek Ridge
Ontelaunee Heights
Shadow Ridge
Tree Tops
Village at Maiden Creek
Walnut Manor
Willow Gardens
Hidden Meadows
Manor Creek
Meadowbrook
Melrose Place
Park Place

Transportation

The principal roads are U.S. Route 222, PA Route 73, and Park Road. Berks Area Regional Transportation Authority (BARTA) serves the township with bus route 22 along the Park Road corridor, providing a route for workers to the East Penn Manufacturing Company plant in Lyons.

Demographics

As of the 2000 census, of 2000, there were 6,553 people, 2,276 households, and 1,884 families residing in the township.  The population density was 494.5 people per square mile (191.0/km).  There were 2,357 housing units at an average density of 177.9/sq mi (68.7/km).  The racial makeup of the township was 96.61% White, 0.89% African American, 0.06% Native American, 1.27% Asian, 0.55% from other races, and 0.63% from two or more races. Hispanic or Latino of any race were 2.29% of the population.

There were 2,276 households, out of which 43.6% had children under the age of 18 living with them, 72.5% were married couples living together, 6.6% had a female householder with no husband present, and 17.2% were non-families. 12.3% of all households were made up of individuals, and 4.2% had someone living alone who was 65 years of age or older.  The average household size was 2.88 and the average family size was 3.15.

In the township, the population was spread out, with 28.7% under the age of 18, 6.2% from 18 to 24, 36.2% from 25 to 44, 20.7% from 45 to 64, and 8.3% who were 65 years of age or older.  The median age was 35 years. For every 100 females, there were 100.3 males.  For every 100 females age 18 and over, there were 98.3 males.

The median income for a household in the township was $62,724, and the median income for a family was $68,438. Males had a median income of $44,000 versus $30,373 for females. The per capita income for the township was $24,662.  About 2.1% of families and 3.1% of the population were below the poverty line, including 3.4% of those under age 18 and 12.2% of those age 65 or over.

Government and school district
Maidencreek Township is a Pennsylvania “second class township” that consists of the Village of Blandon, Evansville, Maidencreek, and Molltown.  The area is served by the Fleetwood Area School District. Emergency services are provided by the Northern Berks Regional Police Department, Blandon Fire Company, and Blandon Ambulance, all of which are dispatched by the Berks County Communications Center.

References

External links

 Maidencreek Township

Townships in Berks County, Pennsylvania
Townships in Pennsylvania